The arthropods of Qatar consist of many organisms including insects and arachnids, as well as myriapods and crustaceans recorded from Qatar.

Class Insecta

Coleoptera

Buprestidae
Chrysobothris parvipunctata (Obenberger, 1914)
Julodis euphratica (Laporte & Gory, 1835)

Coccinellidae

Cheilomenes sexmaculata (Fabricius, 1781)
Coccinella septempunctata (Linnaeus, 1758)
Coccinella undecimpunctata (Linnaeus, 1758)
Hyperaspis vinciguerrae (Capra, 1929)
Scymnus nubilus (Mulsant, 1850)

Scarabaeidae
Labarrus lividus (Olivier, 1789)
Maladera insanabilis (Brenske, 1894)
Oryctes agamemnon (Burmeister, 1847)
Oryctes elegans (Prell, 1914)
Pentodon algerinus dispar (Fuessly, 1788)
Scarabaeus bannuensis (Janssens, 1940)

Diptera

Calliphoridae
Calliphora vicina (Robineau-Desvoidy, 1830)
Chrysomya albiceps (Wiedemann, 1819)
Chrysomya marginalis (Wiedemann, 1830)
Chrysomya megacephala (Fabricius, 1794)
Lucilia sericata (Meigen, 1826)

Muscidae
Coenosia attenuata (Stein, 1903)
Coenosia tigrina (Fabricius, 1775)
Musca albina (Wiedemann, 1830)
Musca domestica (Linnaeus, 1758)
Musca sorbens (Wiedemann, 1830)
Stomoxys calcitrans (Linnaeus, 1758)

Tabanidae
Tabanus sufis (Jaennicke, 1867)

Lepidoptera
List of Lepidoptera of Qatar

Zygentoma

Lepismatidae

Lepisma saccharina (Linnaeus, 1758)
Thermobia aegyptiaca (Lucas, 1840)
Thermobia domestica (Packard, 1873)

Arth
arth
Qatar